BIL is a  Ericsson 80 yacht.

Career
BIL won the Fastnet Race line honours in 1997 with skipper Ross Field, Matthew Humphries, Halvard Mabire and Michel Lefebvre, Jr.

References

1990s sailing yachts
Sailing yachts built in France
Sailing yachts designed by Bruce Farr
Farr Maxi One Design yachts